Donato Alejandro Estala Carrillo (born October 6, 1992, in Durango City, Durango) is a Mexican professional footballer.

Career
Estala has played in the Ascenso MX with Potros UAEM and Atlante F.C., and in the Segunda División with Cruz Azul Hidalgo, Patriotas de Córdoba and Pioneros de Cancún.

Honours

Club
Chapulineros de Oaxaca
 Liga de Balompié Mexicano: 2021

References

External links

1992 births
Living people
Mexican footballers
Association football midfielders
Patriotas de Córdoba footballers
Potros UAEM footballers
Pioneros de Cancún footballers
Atlante F.C. footballers
Ascenso MX players
Liga Premier de México players
Tercera División de México players
Liga de Balompié Mexicano players
Footballers from Durango
People from Durango City